Velfjord is a former municipality in Nordland county, Norway.  The  municipality existed from 1875 until its dissolution in 1964. Velfjord municipality was centered around the Velfjorden in what is now Brønnøy Municipality.  Most of the municipality is located on the mainland, but it also includes nearly 100 small islands, islet, and skjerries.  The administrative centre was the village of Hommelstø at the innermost part of the fjord.  Velfjord Church lies just west of Hommelstø.

History
The municipality of Velfjord was created on 1 October 1875 when the large Brønnøy Municipality was divided into Brønnøy (in the west) and Velfjord (in the east).  Initially, Velfjord had a population of 1,162.  During the 1960s, there were many municipal mergers across Norway due to the work of the Schei Committee.  On 1 January 1964, Velfjord Municipality (population: 1,380) was merged with the town of Brønnøysund (population: 2,064), Sømna Municipality (population: 2,347), Brønnøy Municipality (population: 2,635), and the Lande area of Bindal Municipality to form a new, enlarged Brønnøy Municipality.

Name
The municipality is named after the local Velfjorden which is a central geographical feature for the municipality. The first element is likely the old name for the fjord  which has an unknown meaning. Historically, the name was also spelled Velfjorden.

Government
While it existed, this municipality was responsible for primary education (through 10th grade), outpatient health services, senior citizen services, unemployment, social services, zoning, economic development, and municipal roads. During its existence, this municipality was governed by a municipal council of elected representatives, which in turn elected a mayor.

Municipal council
The municipal council  of Velfjord was made up of representatives that were elected to four year terms.  The party breakdown of the final municipal council was as follows:

Notable people
 Kristine Andersen Vesterfjell (1910–1987) was a Norwegian, South Sami reindeer herder and cultural advocate

See also
List of former municipalities of Norway

References

External links
Website for Velfjord
 Pictures from Velfjord 
Nævernes Gaard

Brønnøy
Former municipalities of Norway
1875 establishments in Norway
1964 disestablishments in Norway